Shaun Prescott (born 7 September 1966) is an Australian former cricketer. He played four first-class cricket matches for Victoria between 1990 and 1995.

See also
 List of Victoria first-class cricketers

References

External links
 

1966 births
Living people
Australian cricketers
Victoria cricketers
Cricketers from Melbourne